Gerry Anthony Morrissey (born 12 April 1960) is an Irish-born British trade unionist and was the head of the BECTU sector of the Prospect union up until his retirement in 2018. He was succeeded by Philippa Childs.

Born in Tipperary, Ireland, Morrissey attended the local Christian Brothers school. He began his career as a catering buyer at the BBC, joining the Association of Broadcasting Staff in 1977. He became prominent in the union as it underwent a series of mergers to form the Broadcasting, Entertainment, Cinematograph and Theatre Union (BECTU).  In 1998, he became one of BECTU's two Assistant General Secretaries. In February 2007, he was elected General Secretary without opposition. He is married with two children. From 2011, Morrissey also served as the President of the Union Network International's Media and Entertainment International section.

Morrissey took BECTU into a merger with Prospect at the start of 2017, and became the first head of the new BECTU sector of Prospect.

References

20th-century Irish people
21st-century Irish people
British trade unionists
British trade union leaders
1960 births
Living people
People from County Tipperary
Irish emigrants to the United Kingdom